Miami Worldcenter is a large mixed-use development under construction led by principals Arthur Falcone and Nitin Motwani, spanning several blocks in the Park West neighborhood of Miami, Florida, just north of downtown. It may include over 25 acres of land, with a convention center, hotel space, residential, as well as copious street level retail and large anchor tenant space, such as Macy's and Bloomingdale's. The hotel and convention center are planned to be part of the same 55 storey building. The hotel will be very large with 1,800 rooms over the approximately  convention center. The project will connect with the Brightline higher-speed rail system's MiamiCentral station. Additionally, the Freedom Tower Metromover station was renovated in 2021 and 2022. 

Taubman announced that it will not be developing an enclosed regional mall as demand moved away from enclosed malls. Instead the plans were changed to reflect an open-air development better suited for Miami's sunny weather.

On 14 January 2019, the first development at Miami Worldcenter, the Caoba apartment tower, was opened. Paramount Miami Worldcenter opened in 2019.

See also
 List of tallest buildings in Miami

References

External links

 
 Miami Worldcenter at Emporis

Mixed-use developments in Florida